Andrew Reid (born 15 March 1994) is a British motorcycle racer. In 2010 he participated for the first time in a 125cc World Championship event, as a wild-card rider in the British round at Silverstone but failed to qualify for the race. He made his Grand Prix debut under the Irish flag. He currently competes in the British National Superstock 1000 Championship, aboard a BMW S1000rr.

Career statistics

Grand Prix motorcycle racing

By season

Races by year
(key) (Races in bold indicate pole position)

Supersport World Championship

Races by year
(key)

References

External links
Profile on MotoGP.com
Profile on WorldSBK.com
Profile on BritishSuperbike.com

Living people
Motorcycle racers from Northern Ireland
125cc World Championship riders
1994 births
Supersport World Championship riders